Pujolina is a genus of flies in the family Tachinidae.

Species
P. bicolor Mesnil, 1968
P. leucaniae Chao & Jin, 1984

References

Exoristinae
Diptera of Asia
Tachinidae genera